"Never Be Lonely" is a song by English rock band the Feeling. It is the third single from their 2006 debut album, Twelve Stops and Home, and was released on 28 August 2006. It entered the UK Singles Chart at number 24 on 27 August 2006 based on download sales alone. The following week, it climbed to number 12 with additional physical sales. The song entered the top 10 of the UK Singles Chart in its third week, peaking at number nine.

The song was nominated for Best Track at the 2006 Q Awards, along with Arctic Monkeys' "I Bet You Look Good on the Dancefloor", Snow Patrol's "Chasing Cars", Gnarls Barkley's "Crazy" and Scissor Sisters' "I Don't Feel Like Dancin'". "Crazy" eventually won.

Track listings
UK CD single
 "Never Be Lonely"
 "All You Need to Do"
 "This Time" (demo)

UK limited-edition 7-inch single
A. "Never Be Lonely"
B. "All You Need to Do"

Digital download
 "Never Be Lonely" (acoustic) – 3:39

Charts

Weekly charts

Year-end charts

References

The Feeling songs
2006 singles
2006 songs
Island Records singles
Songs written by Ciaran Jeremiah
Songs written by Dan Gillespie Sells
Songs written by Kevin Jeremiah
Songs written by Paul Stewart (musician)
Songs written by Richard Jones (The Feeling)